Vericon is an annual science fiction convention at Harvard University, organized by the Harvard-Radcliffe Science Fiction Association. Lasting over a three-day weekend, for the first nine years of its existence it took place on the last weekend of January; for 2010, however, it was moved to mid-March to accommodate changes in Harvard College's academic calendar. It has been described as the largest college-based science fiction convention in the United States.

Vericon was held most recently in 2016, and is currently on hiatus.

The convention features anime, boardgames, cosplay, Human Chess, dances, LARPs, and RPGs. The convention is unusual for a college science fiction convention in that in addition to gaming, a number of prominent people involved in the genres of science fiction, fantasy, game design, and comics are invited each year to host panels and readings. Guests have included:

 2016 (March 18–20): Ann Leckie, John Chu, Wesley Chu, Pamela Dean, Seth Dickinson, Greer Gilman, Malka Older, Ada Palmer, Jo Walton, Fran Wilde
 2015 (March 20–22): Ken Liu, M. L. Brennan, Carl Engle-Laird, Greer Gilman, Mary Robinette Kowal, Andrew Liptak, B. L. Marsh, Will McIntosh, Daniel José Older, Ada Palmer, Luke Scull, Alex Shvartsman, Jo Walton
 2014 (March 21–23): Patrick Rothfuss, Max Gladstone, Jo Walton, Scott Lynch, M. L. Brennan, Shira Lipkin, Saladin Ahmed, Luke Scull, Greer Gilman
 2013 (March 22–24): Tamora Pierce, Jeffrey Carver, Greer Gilman, N. K. Jemisin, Shira Lipkin, Seanan McGuire, Jennifer Pelland, Jo Walton	
 2012 (March 16–18): Vernor Vinge, Greer Gilman, Lev Grossman, Jennifer Pelland, Thomas Sniegoski, R.L. Stine, Aaron Diaz, Christopher Hastings, Michael Terracciano
 2011 (March 18–20): Brandon Sanderson, Austin Grossman, Holly Black, Catherine Asaro, Sarah Smith, Ellen Kushner, Delia Sherman
 2010 (March 19–21): Timothy Zahn, Katherine Howe, Resa Nelson, Paul Tremblay, Greer Gilman, John Crowley, Randall Munroe, Dorothy Gambrell, Michael Terracciano. 
 2009 (January 23–25): Kim Stanley Robinson, Elizabeth Bear, Paul Di Filippo, Allen Steele,  Robert V.S. Redick, Catherynne Valente, Don D'Ammassa, Marie Brennan, Brad Guigar, Kristofer Straub
 2008 (January 25–27): Orson Scott Card, Lois Lowry, M.T. Anderson, Elizabeth Haydon, James Patrick Kelly, Kelly Link, Donna Jo Napoli, Sharyn November, Cassandra Clare, William Sleator, Pete Abrams, Jeph Jacques, Randall Munroe
 2007 (January 26–28): Guy Gavriel Kay, R. A. Salvatore, Jeffrey Carver, Sharyn November, Shaenon Garrity, Jeffrey Rowland
 2006 (January 27–29): George R. R. Martin, Greer Gilman, Elaine Isaak, Marie Brennan, Sarah Smith, Tim Buckley, Randy Milholland, Jeph Jacques, Michael Terracciano
 2005 (January 28–30): Jacqueline Carey, Patrick Nielsen Hayden, Teresa Nielsen Hayden, James Morrow, James Alan Gardner, Debra Doyle, James D. Macdonald
 2004 (January 30 – February 1): Mike Carey, Brian Clevinger, Peter David
 2003 (January 24–26): Catherine Asaro, Julie Czerneda, Ellen Kushner, Charles Vess
 2002 (January 25–27): Henry Jenkins, Scott McCloud, Terry Moore, Susan Shwartz
 2001 (January 26–28): Pete Abrams, James Ernest, Paul Levinson, Margaret Weis, Don Perrin, Michael A. Burstein, Jeffrey Carver, Esther Friesner, Peter Heck, James Morrow, Donna Jo Napoli

References

Defunct science fiction conventions in the United States
Harvard University